James Charnock (18 March 1851, Dukinfield – 28 May 1899 Moscow) was an English mechanical engineer who spent much of his career in Imperial Russia. His brothers Clement Charnock and Harry Charnock joined him in Russia.

James studied at St Johns school Dukinfield and Stalybridge Mechanical Institute, whilst also working for Edward Sidebottom's company. Then at the age of 16 he was recommended by Platt Brothers to De Jersey & Co. to go and work as an engineer in Russia.

In 1897 James was working for the Vikula Morozov Company at their factory in Nikolskoye when there was a strike by 8,000 spinners, mostly women. Charnock became involved in the negotiations, which was taken as a sign that management was reluctant to concede a reduction in the working day to levels enjoyed by workers at the neighbouring factory run by Savva Morozov. The crowd of strikers became very angry and moved onto Charnock's house. He was away at the factory, and his wife and children had fled. The police killed one worker and wounded two others, which further enraged the crowd who then invaded the Charnock residence, setting it alight.

References

1851 births
1899 deaths
English mechanical engineers